Muriel Morgan Gibbon (14 January 1887 – 1975), was a British journalist, novelist, barrister and Liberal Party politician.

Early life
Morgan Gibbon was born the daughter of Reverend J. Morgan Gibbon, of Stamford Hill Congregational Church. She was educated at Girton College, Cambridge where she earned a Master of Arts in the Classics.

Professional career
Morgan Gibbon worked as a journalist. She was also a novelist; her publications included: 
Jan (1920)
Helen Marsden - A Novel
The Alternative (1921)
John Peregrine's Wife (1922)
Others Came 
Justin Keyes 
The Pharisees (1922)
No 7 Paradise
Curious Fool (1939)

She received a call to the bar by the Middle Temple in 1938 and practised in the divorce courts. In 1962 she was present in the courtroom when Elizabeth Lane took her seat as the first female Divorce Court commissioner.

Political career
Morgan Gibbon joined David Lloyd George supporting National Liberals in 1922, serving on the Hackney North committee. She was selected as prospective parliamentary Liberal candidate for the Norwood division of Lambeth in 1926. She first ran as Liberal London County Council candidate for Islington South in 1928. She was adopted as the Liberal parliamentary candidate for Hackney South in February 1929 and contested the General Election a few months later, finishing second to Herbert Morrison. She did not stand for parliament again. During the 1931 General Election, she spoke in support of Herbert Morrison in his election campaign. She joined the Labour Party in November 1931.

Electoral record

References

1887 births
1975 deaths
English women novelists
Liberal Party (UK) parliamentary candidates
Alumni of Girton College, Cambridge
English women lawyers
Members of the Middle Temple
20th-century English lawyers
20th-century English women
20th-century English people